William Willoughby Cole, 1st Earl of Enniskillen (1 March 1736 – 22 May 1803), styled The Honourable from 1760 to 1767, then known as Lord Mountflorence to 1776 and as Viscount Enniskillen to 1789, was an Irish peer and politician.

Enniskillen was the eldest son of John Cole, 1st Baron Mountflorence of Florence Court, County Fermanagh.

Cole represented Enniskillen in the Irish House of Commons from 1761 to 1767, when he succeeded his father as second Baron Mountflorence and took his seat in the Irish House of Lords. In 1776, he was created Viscount Enniskillen and in 1789 he was even further honoured when he was made Earl of Enniskillen. Both these titles are in the Peerage of Ireland.

Private life

In November 1763 Enniskillen married Anne, daughter of Galbraith Lowry-Corry, MP [I] for Tyrone and sister of Armar Lowry-Corry, 1st Earl Belmore. They had four sons and four daughters:

John Willoughby Cole, Viscount Enniskillen (1768–1840), his heir
 Hon. Sir Galbraith Lowry Cole (1772–1842) 
 Hon. Rev. William Montgomery Cole (died October 1804), Dean of Waterford 
Hon. Arthur Henry Cole (1780–1844)
Lady Sarah Cole (died 14 March 1833), married Owen Wynne
Lady Elizabeth Anne (died 1807), married Richard Magenis
Lady Florence Cole (died 1 March 1862), married Blayney Townley-Balfour
Lady Henrietta Frances (22 June 1784 – 2 July 1848), married Earl de Grey

Lord Enniskillen died in May 1803, aged 67, and was succeeded in his titles by his eldest son.

References

|-

1736 births
1803 deaths
People educated at Kilkenny College
Irish MPs 1761–1768
Members of the Parliament of Ireland (pre-1801) for County Fermanagh constituencies
Earls of Enniskillen
Cole family (Anglo-Irish aristocracy)